Bob Blasi (born September 24, 1930) is a retired American football coach.  He was the head coach at University of Northern Colorado in Greeley, Colorado from 1966 to 1984, compiling a record of 107–71–3. He produced many good teams in his 18 years as head coach, but the best was the 1969 squad, which finished 10–0, won the Rocky Mountain Athletic Conference title and was ranked No. 3 in the final United Press International poll. Blasi was inducted into the Colorado Sports Hall of Fame in 2010.

Head coaching record

References

1930 births
Living people
American football guards
American football linebackers
Colorado State Rams football coaches
Colorado State Rams football players
Northern Colorado Bears football coaches
High school football coaches in Montana
People from Kingman, Kansas
People from Pratt, Kansas
Players of American football from Kansas